Dil Jeetegi Desi Girl (Desi Girl Will Win Hearts) is an Indian reality television series based on the American show The Simple Life. The first season of the series aired on Imagine TV.

Series

Season 1
Dil Jeetegi Desi Girl 1 premiered on 21 May 2010 on Imagine TV. Hosted by Rohit Roy, the season ended on 4 July 2010 with Roshni Chopra emerging as the winner.

Contestants

 Roshni Chopra | Winner
 Kashmera Shah | First Runner Up
 Ishita Arun | Second Runner Up
 Aushima Sawhney
 Monica Bedi 
 Sambhavana Sheth 
 Anmol Singh
 Rucha Gujarathi

References

External links
Dil Jeetegi Desi Girl Official Site on Imagine TV

Imagine TV original programming
Indian reality television series
2010 Indian television series endings
2010 Indian television series debuts